Min Swe Naing (born 29 January 1970) is a Burmese politician who currently serves as a House of Nationalities member of parliament for Kachin State № 6 constituency. He is a member of the National League for Democracy.

Early life and education 
Min Swe Naing was born in Nang Kham Village, Mohnyin Township, Kachin State on 12 January 1970. He is an ethnic Shan. He graduated B.Sc., zool from Myintkyina College in 1993.

Political career
He is a member of the National League for Democracy Party, he was elected as an Pyithu Hluttaw MP, winning a majority of 15,367 votes and elected representative from kachin State No. 6 parliamentary constituency.

References

National League for Democracy politicians
1970 births
Living people
People from Kachin State
Burmese people of Shan descent
Members of the House of Nationalities